Marián Svoboda is a Czech basketball coach of the Slovakian national team, which he coached at the EuroBasket Women 2017.

References

1960 births
Living people
Czech women's basketball coaches
Czech expatriate sportspeople in Slovakia